Aethes obscurana is a species of moth of the family Tortricidae. It was described by Aristide Caradja in 1916. It is found in the European part of Russia and Central Asia (Juldus, Alai, Zailijskij Ala Tau, Dshungarskij Ala Tau).

References

obscurana
Moths described in 1916
Moths of Europe
Moths of Asia